486th may refer to:

486th Air Expeditionary Wing, provisional United States Air Force unit assigned to the Air Combat Command
486th Bombardment Squadron, inactive United States Air Force unit
486th Fighter Squadron, inactive United States Air Force unit

See also
486 (number)
486 (disambiguation)
486, the year 486 (CDLXXXVI) of the Julian calendar
486 BC